Bloomfield Township, Ohio may refer to:

Bloomfield Township, Jackson County, Ohio
Bloomfield Township, Logan County, Ohio
Bloomfield Township, Trumbull County, Ohio

See also
 Bloom Township, Ohio (disambiguation)

Ohio township disambiguation pages